The Krzyż za Zasługi dla ZHP ("Cross of Merit for the ZHP") is the highest decoration of the Polish Scouting and Guiding Association (ZHP). The order is awarded to members of the ZHP for heroic acts. It was established on 1 July 1965. The Order has three classes:

See also
 Krzyż Harcerski

Polish Scouting ranks
Civil awards and decorations of Poland
Awards established in 1965